The 2005 Tidjelabine bombing occurred on July 29, 2005 when an explosive bomb detonated against a patrol of the Gendarmerie Nationale in the town of Tidjelabine, Boumerdès Province, Algeria killing 2 and injuring 4. The Al-Qaeda Organization in the Islamic Maghreb was suspected as being responsible.

See also
 Terrorist bombings in Algeria
 List of terrorist incidents, 2005

References

Boumerdès Province
Suicide car and truck bombings in Algeria
Mass murder in 2005
Terrorist incidents in Algeria
Terrorist incidents in Algeria in 2005
2005 murders in Algeria
Islamic terrorism in Algeria